Marlon Menjívar Ernesto (born 1 September 1965) is a retired Salvadoran professional footballer.

Club career
The moustached Menjívar was part of Luis Ángel Firpo's most successful team of all time, playing in midfield alongside Firpo greats as Leonel Cárcamo, Edgar Henríquez and Giovanni Trigueros and winning four league titles with them. He scored the winning (and only) goal in the 1991 championship final against C.D. Águila.

International career
Menjívar made his debut for El Salvador in a March 1989 friendly match against Guatemala and has earned a total of 16 caps, scoring no goals. He has represented his country at the 1995 UNCAF Nations Cup and was a non-playing squad member at the 1996 CONCACAF Gold Cup.

His final international game was a December 1996 FIFA World Cup qualification match against Cuba.

Personal life
Menjívar has a construction business and runs his own soccer academy in Maryland, United States. His daughter Zulia plays for Montgomery College Rockville and was called up for the El Salvador women U-20 team in 2011.

References

External links
 

1965 births
Living people
Association football midfielders
Salvadoran footballers
El Salvador international footballers
1996 CONCACAF Gold Cup players
C.D. Luis Ángel Firpo footballers